Dhison Hernández (born 14 October 1984) is a Venezuelan rower. He competed in the men's single sculls event at the 2008 Summer Olympics.

References

External links
 

1984 births
Living people
Venezuelan male rowers
Olympic rowers of Venezuela
Rowers at the 2008 Summer Olympics
Sportspeople from Caracas
20th-century Venezuelan people
21st-century Venezuelan people